Warren James Hinckle III (October 12, 1938 – August 25, 2016) was an American political journalist based in San Francisco. Hinckle is remembered for his tenure as editor of Ramparts magazine, turning a sleepy publication aimed at a liberal Roman Catholic audience into a major galvanizing force of American radicalism during the Vietnam War era. He also helped create Gonzo journalism by first pairing Hunter S. Thompson with illustrator Ralph Steadman.

Biography

Hinckle was born in San Francisco to Warren James Hinckle Jr., a dockworker, and Angela Catherine DeVere, who survived the 1906 San Francisco earthquake. He graduated from Archbishop Riordan High School in 1956.

As a student at the University of San Francisco, Warren Hinckle wrote for the student newspaper, the San Francisco Foghorn. After college, he worked for the San Francisco Chronicle.

From 1964 to 1969, he was executive editor of Ramparts. Under his leadership, it became a widely circulated muckraking magazine that was based in San Francisco and heavily involved in antiwar New Left politics. In 1966, the magazine won the prestigious George Polk Award for Magazine Reporting. 

Hinckle wrote the cover story, "The Social History of the Hippies," for the March 1967 issue. Contributing editor Ralph J. Gleason resigned in protest and turned his attention to a new magazine, Rolling Stone, which he co-founded with former Ramparts staffer Jann Wenner; its first issue appeared later that year. 

In 1967, Hinckle was among more than 500 writers and editors who signed the "Writers and Editors War Tax Protest" pledge, vowing to refuse to pay the 10% Vietnam War Tax surcharge proposed by president Johnson.

After leaving Ramparts in 1969, Hinckle co-founded and edited the magazine Scanlan's Monthly with New York journalist Sidney Zion. There he matched illustrator Ralph Steadman with Hunter S. Thompson to produce "The Kentucky Derby Is Decadent and Depraved" (1970), the first work of Gonzo journalism.

After Scanlan's folded in 1971, Hinckle was involved with a number of publications, including editing Francis Ford Coppola's ambitious City magazine, which ceased publication in 1976. In 1991 he revived The Argonaut, and was its editor and publisher and also of its online version, Argonaut360.

Hinckle wrote or co-wrote over a dozen books, including a 1974 autobiography, If You Have a Lemon, Make Lemonade.

After working for both major San Francisco dailies, the Chronicle and The San Francisco Examiner, Hinckle went to work as a columnist for the San Francisco Independent, founded in 1987. Hinckle used his post at the Independent to advocate for his personal political beliefs. During his time at the Independent Hinckle also wrote campaign literature for various politicians.

Hinckle wore a black patch to cover an eye that was lost in his youth due to an archery accident. (The San Francisco Chronicle said it was an auto accident). He was the father of the journalist Pia Hinckle. He died of pneumonia on August 25, 2016 at the age of 77 at a hospital in San Francisco.

Works

Books
 Guerilla-Krieg in USA [Guerrilla War in the USA], with Steven Chain and David Goldstein. Stuttgart: Deutsche Verlagsanstalt (1971). .
 If You Have a Lemon, Make Lemonade. New York: Putnam (1974). .
 The Richest Place on Earth: The Story of Virginia City, and the Heyday of the Comstock Lode, with Fredric Hobbs. Boston: Houghton Mifflin (1978). .
 The Fish is Red: The Story of the Secret War Against Castro, with William W. Turner. New York: Harper & Row (1981). .
 Gayslayer! The Story of How Dan White Killed Harvey Milk and George Moscone & Got Away with Murder. Silver Dollar Books (1985). .
 The Agnos Years, 1988-1991. San Francisco Independent (1991). .
 J. Parker Whitney: Frontier Conservationist & Versatile Man of the West. San Francisco: Argonaut Press (1993). .
 The Fourth Reich: The Menace of the New Germany (1993).

Books edited
 Who Killed Hunter S. Thompson?: The Picaresque Story of the Birth of Gonzo. Last Gasp of San Francisco (2017). .

References

Further reading
 Richardson, Peter (2009). A Bomb In Every Issue: How the Short, Unruly Life of Ramparts Magazine Changed America. New York: New Press. .
 Rubens, Lisa (2013). Warren Hinckle: Journalist, Editor, Publisher, Iconoclast (oral history). Interviews conducted in 2009-2012. The Bancroft Library, University of California, Berkeley.
 Staff writer (Aug. 26, 2018). "Warren Hinckle, 77, Ramparts Editor Who Embraced Gonzo Journalism, Dies" (obituary). New York Times.

External links
 Argonaut360
 FBI file: HINCKLE, Warren at Internet Archive

20th-century American journalists
21st-century American journalists
20th-century American non-fiction writers
21st-century American non-fiction writers
American alternative journalists
American magazine editors
Writers from the San Francisco Bay Area
Journalists from the San Francisco Bay Area
San Francisco Examiner people
Activists from the San Francisco Bay Area
American tax resisters
American male journalists
20th-century American male writers
21st-century American male writers
University of San Francisco alumni
Deaths from pneumonia in California
1938 births
2016 deaths